East Point is an unincorporated community in Johnson County, Kentucky, United States. The community's first settlers were the Matthias Harman, Greer and Auxier families at Blockhouse Bottom. Their fort, Fort Harmon, was the site of numerous Indian raids. The first post office was originally established in Floyd County on February 6, 1871, but was moved to Johnson County in 1877. Its current ZIP code is 41216.

East Point is located at an elevation of 623 feet.

References

Unincorporated communities in Johnson County, Kentucky
Unincorporated communities in Kentucky